SYSACCO is a Syrian-Saudi Chemical Company with headquarter in Aleppo, Syria. SYSACCO is Syria’s only chlorine manufacturing plant.

Products
They mostly produce products for water sterilization to the local market:
 Sodium hydroxide, also known as Caustic Soda.
 Chlorine gas cylinders.
 Sodium hypochlorite, the sodium salt of hypochlorous acid.
 Hydrochloric Acid, a clear, colorless, highly pungent solution of hydrogen chloride in water.

References

External links
 www.sysacco.net

Chemical plants